The men's 4 × 400 metres relay event at the 2014 Asian Games was held at the Incheon Asiad Main Stadium, Incheon, South Korea on 29 September – 2 October.

Schedule
All times are Korea Standard Time (UTC+09:00)

Records

Results
Legend
DNF — Did not finish
DNS — Did not start

Round 1
 Qualification: First 3 in each heat (Q) and the next 2 fastest (q) advance to the final.

Heat 1

Heat 2

Final

References

 results

Relay 400 men
2014 400 men